Rule or ruling may refer to:

Education
 Royal University of Law and Economics (RULE), a university in Cambodia

Human activity 
 The exercise of political or personal control by someone with authority or power
 Business rule, a rule pertaining to the structure or behavior internal to a business
 School rule, a rule that is part of school discipline
 Sport rule, a rule that defines how a sport is played
 Game rule, a rule that defines how a game is played
 Moral, a rule or element of a moral code for guiding choices in human behavior
 Norm (philosophy), a kind of sentence or a reason to act, feel or believe
 Rule of thumb, a principle with broad application that is not intended to be strictly accurate or reliable for every situation
 Unspoken rule, an assumed rule of human behavior that is not voiced or written down
 Slide rule, a mechanical analog computer

Science 
 Rule of inference or transformation rule, a term in logic for a function which takes premises and returns a conclusion
 Phrase structure rule or rewrite rule, used in some theories of linguistics
 "Rule X" elementary cellular automaton, where X is a number between 0-255 characterizing a specific model (e.g. Rule 110)
 Ruler, or "rule"; a distance measuring device
 Phonological rule
 Social norm, explicit or implicit rules used within society or by a group

Law and government 

 Advance tax ruling, a tool for conforming taxation arrangements
 Court order, a decision by a court
 Government
 In rulemaking by the federal government of the United States, a regulation mandated by Congress, but written or expanded upon by the executive branch
 Law, which may informally be called a "rule"
 Military rule, governance by a military body
 Monastic rule, a collection of precepts that guides the life of monks or nuns in a religious order
 Procedural law, a ruleset governing the application of laws to cases
 Rule of law, government based not on arbitrary decisions of officials but on laws

Geography
 Rule, Arkansas
 Rule, Texas

Literature 
 The Rules, bestselling self-help book
 Rules (novel), 2007 Newbery Honor book by Cynthia Lord
 "The Rulers", a science fiction short story by A. E. van Vogt

Music
 Ja Rule (born 1976), hip hop artist

Albums
 R.U.L.E., by Ja Rule, 2004
 Rule, by Anna Tsuchiya, 2010
 Rules (album), by the Whitest Boy Alive, 2009
 Rules, by First Blood, 2017
 Rules!, by Manila Luzon, 2019

Songs
 "Rule" (Nas song), 2001
 "Rule"/"Sparkle", a double A-side by Ayumi Hamasaki, 2009
 "Rule", by X Ambassadors from Orion, 2019
 "Rules" (Doja Cat song), 2019
 "Rules" (KMFDM song), 1996
 "Rules", by Shakira from Laundry Service, 2001

Other uses 
 Rule (surname)
 The Rule (film), a 2014 American documentary
 Ruler (film), a 2019 Telugu-language film
 Rules: Pyaar Ka Superhit Formula, a 2003 Bollywood film
 rule: a snippet of code which can perform email filtering
 Rule (horse) (born 2007), American racehorse
 Rules (restaurant), upscale English restaurant in London
 Rules!, a 2014 iOS video game
 "Rule #1" (Batwoman)
 Rule (Bosnia and Herzegovina), political party

See also
 
 
 
 
 Debate (parliamentary procedure) for rules governing discussion on the merits of a pending question.